Petra Schmidt-Schaller (born 28 August 1980) is a German actress. She is noted for the roles of Helene in Runaway Horse alongside Ulrich Noethen, Ulrich Tukur and Katja Riemann, and Maud Brewster in The Sea Wolf (2008 ProSieben film) alongside Thomas Kretschmann.

Life and career
Schmidt-Schaller was born in Magdeburg, the daughter of actors Andreas Schmidt-Schaller and Christine Krüger. She grew up in Prenzlauer Berg, a borough of East Berlin. Although she comes from a family of actors, her first experience with acting was during a one-year stay 1997–1998 as an exchange student in Kansas, where she attended her High School's acting class. Before her movie and TV career, she studied acting at the Felix Mendelssohn College of Music and Theatre in Leipzig from 2001 to 2005, and acted at the Deutsches Nationaltheater Weimar from 2003 to 2005.

Having played leading roles in several German films, a minor part in Dark Castle Entertainment's Unknown (2011) was her first international assignment. After A Hero's Welcome (Nacht vor Augen, 2008) and Almanya – Welcome to Germany (Almanya – Willkommen in Deutschland, 2011), Unknown was her third work that was screened at the Berlin International Film Festival. For the TV movie Happiness Divided (Das geteilte Glück, 2010) she was awarded the German Actors' Award and was nominated for the German Television Award as best actress. In Marcus H. Rosenmüller's comedy-drama  she starred as Amrita, a member of the Rajneesh movement caught between the pursuit of self-realization and the love of her children.

Schmidt-Schaller lives in Berlin. In August 2011, she gave birth to a daughter.

Selected filmography
 (2006)
Runaway Horse (Ein fliehendes Pferd, 2007)
A Hero's Welcome (Nacht vor Augen, 2008)
The Sea Wolf (Der Seewolf, TV, 2008)
Balkan Traffic – Übermorgen Nirgendwo (2008)
Tatort – Bluthochzeit (TV, 2009)
A Summer in Long Island (Ein Sommer in Long Island, TV, 2009)
Happiness Divided (Das geteilte Glück, TV, 2010)
Unknown (2011)
Almanya – Welcome to Germany (Almanya – Willkommen in Deutschland, 2011)
Löwenzahn – Das Kinoabenteuer (2011)
The Good Neighbour (Unter Nachbarn, 2011)
The Dark Nest (Das dunkle Nest, TV, 2011)
 (2011)
Nein, Aus, Pfui! Ein Baby an der Leine (2012)
Der Tote im Watt (TV, 2013)
Tatort – Feuerteufel (TV, 2013)
 (TV, 2013)
Stereo (2014)
 (TV, 2018)
Marnow Murders (Die Toten von Marnow, TV, 2021)

Awards
 Bavarian Film Award 2007 for Best Upcoming Actress, Runaway Horse
 Deutscher Schauspielerpreis (German Actors' Award) 2012 for the most inspiring actress in a leading role, Happiness Divided

References

External links

 
 Official Website 
 Petra Schmidt-Schaller's profile at Hoestermann actors agency 

1980 births
Living people
Actors from Magdeburg
People from Bezirk Magdeburg
German film actresses
21st-century German actresses
German television actresses
University of Music and Theatre Leipzig alumni